The Copa América is South America's major tournament in senior men's soccer and determines the continental champion. Until 1967, the tournament was known as South American Championship. It is the oldest continental championship in the world.

Chile are one of the four national teams that participated in the inaugural South American Championship in 1916. During their first six participations, they always ranked last, until they recorded their first match wins in 1926.

It took 99 years for them to win their first continental title, which they defended at the Copa América Centenario in 2016.

Chile won both the 2015 and 2016 final against Argentina on penalties, even though they have never defeated the Albiceleste over regular time in tournament history (28 attempts).

Overall record

Winning tournaments

2015 Copa América

Matches

Final

Man of the Match:
Arturo Vidal (Chile)

2016 Copa América Centenario

Matches

Final

Since the implementation of the new FIFA ruling that a fourth substitute would be allowed in overtime, the Copa América Centenario final was the first match this rule applied to. However, neither team used a fourth substitute.

Record by opponent

Chile's biggest victories at Copa América tournaments were a 7–0 win against Venezuela in 1979, and a 7–0 win against Mexico in 2016.

Their biggest defeats were 0–6 losses, one against Brazil in 1919 and one against Uruguay in 1947.

Record players

Top goalscorers

Players with multiple titles

Fifteen players were part of both the 2015 and 2016 Copa América squads, winning consecutive titles. Johnny Herrera as reserve goalkeeper was a non-playing squad member in both tournaments.

Awards and records

Team Awards
 Champions: 2 (2015 and 2016)
 Runners-up: 4 (1955, 1956, 1979 and 1987)
 Third place: 5 (1926, 1941, 1945, 1967 and 1991)

Individual Awards
 MVP 1941: Sergio Livingstone
 MVP 1955: Enrique Hormazábal
 MVP 1979: Carlos Caszely
 MVP 2016: Alexis Sánchez
 Top scorer 1926: David Arellano (7 goals)
 Top scorer 1937: Raúl Toro (7 goals)
 Top scorer 1953: Francisco Molina (7 goals)
 Top scorer 1956: Enrique Hormazábal (4 goals)
 Top scorer 1979: Jorge Peredo (4 goals) (shared)
 Top scorer 2015: Eduardo Vargas (4 goals) (shared)
 Top scorer 2016: Eduardo Vargas (6 goals)
 Best goalkeeper 2015: Claudio Bravo
 Best goalkeeper 2016: Claudio Bravo

Team records

 Victory with highest number of goals conceded (5–4 v Peru in 1955; tied with Brazil 6–4 Chile in 1937 and Bolivia 5–4 Brazil in 1963)

Individual Records

 Most matches: Sergio Livingstone (34, shared with Lionel Messi)
 Longest time span between two matches: David Pizarro (15 years and 333 days, semi-final v Uruguay in 1999 to group match v Ecuador in 2015)

References

External links
RSSSF archives and results
Soccerway database

 
Chile
Chile national football team